Juan Fabila Mendoza (born 5 June 1944) is a Mexican former boxer who a bronze medal in the bantamweight category (– 54 kg) at the 1964 Summer Olympics. After that he turned professional and won his first five bouts in 1964–1971. He then lost twice by knockout and retired in 1973.

1964 Olympic results
Below is the record of Juan Fabila, a featherweight boxer who competed for Mexico in the 1964 Tokyo Olympics:

 Round of 32: defeated Sadegh Aliakbarzadeh (Iran) by decision, 3-2
 Round of 16: defeated Law Hon-Park (Hong Kong) by decision, 5-0
 Quarterfinal: defeated Oleg Grigoryev (Soviet Union) by decision, 3-2
 Semifinal: lost to Chung Shin-Cho (South Korea) by decision, 1-4 (was awarded bronze medal)

References

Boxers from Mexico City
1944 births
Living people
Boxers at the 1964 Summer Olympics
Olympic boxers of Mexico
Bantamweight boxers
Olympic bronze medalists for Mexico
Olympic medalists in boxing
Mexican male boxers
Medalists at the 1964 Summer Olympics
20th-century Mexican people
21st-century Mexican people